Dipentaspis is an extinct genus of damesellid odontopleurid trilobite. It lived during the Cambrian Period, which lasted from approximately 539 to 485 million years ago.

References

Damesellidae
Cambrian trilobites
Fossils of Kazakhstan
Odontopleurida genera